Robb Eckert is an American politician. He served as a Republican member for the 47th district of the North Dakota House of Representatives.

In 2022, Eckert was elected for the 47th district of the North Dakota House of Representatives, to replace George Keiser, who had died of amyotrophic lateral sclerosis in December 2021. Eckert assumed office on January 21, 2022, but decided not to run for re-election, and was succeeded by Mike Motschenbacher on December 1, 2022.

References 

Living people
Year of birth missing (living people)
Place of birth missing (living people)
Republican Party members of the North Dakota House of Representatives
21st-century American politicians